The Scourge of the Desert (also known as Reformed Outlaw ) is a 1915 American silent short Western starring William S. Hart and Rhea Mitchell.  It was billed as, "A Thrilling (Broncho) Romance of the Arizona Staked Plains."  It was produced by Thomas H. Ince and written by C. Gardner Sullivan, Ince, and William Clifford.

Cast
 William S. Hart as Bill Evers
 Rhea Mitchell as Ellen Holt
 Gordon Mullen as John Holt
 Joseph J. Dowling as Pastor Holt
 Roy Laidlaw as Croupier
 Walter Belasco

References

External links
 

1915 films
1915 Western (genre) films
American silent short films
American black-and-white films
Silent American Western (genre) films
Films directed by William S. Hart
1910s American films
1910s English-language films